Shur Ab is a village in Kavir Rural District, Sheshtaraz District, Khalilabad County, Razavi Khorasan Province, Iran. At the 2006 census, its population was 93, in 22 families.

References 

Populated places in Khalilabad County